Oscar Martinez is a fictional character from the US mockumentary-style television series The Office played by Cuban-American actor Oscar Nunez. Nunez, who is straight, did not know his character might be gay when he first signed on. For the 2006–2007 season, the Gay & Lesbian Alliance Against Defamation (GLAAD) reported he was the only LGBT person of color character on a regular series. For the 2007–2008 season, he was the "only remaining gay character on a half-hour comedy program" and the only LGBT lead or supporting character who is a person of color. For the 2009–2010 season, Martinez was one of four people of color LGBT regular series characters; in 2010–2011 there were six and in 2011–2012 there were five.

Character

Background 
Oscar Martinez is an accountant at the Scranton, Pennsylvania, office of the fictional paper distribution company Dunder Mifflin. In the character's backstory, it is revealed that his parents are from Mexico and moved to the United States one year before he was born. His character was outed by his boss Michael Scott in "Gay Witch Hunt," the third-season premiere episode. However, the character was implied to be gay in the second-season episode "The Secret." In earlier episodes, many co-workers erroneously attribute to him various Mexican stereotypes, but after his outing, the stereotypes are more focused on his being gay, particularly by Michael.  Nunez explained in a 2008 interview that the character variously feels amusement, pity and hatred towards his fictional boss. His counterpart in the original British series is accountant Oliver.

Personality 
The character Oscar is known for being a rational, quietly efficient, and intellectual worker in the office. He is often the one who asks pointed financial questions that his colleagues will not know the answer to, or that his boss avoids answering. Oscar refers to himself as being in the "Coalition for Reason" with fictional co-workers Jim (played by John Krasinski) and Pam Halpert (played by Jenna Fischer). According to Núñez, the three "are there to set up the comic situations" for boss Michael and Dwight Schrute, Michael's toady.  Oscar is considered to be a know-it-all by many of his co-workers. He is frequently exasperated by the antics of his coworkers and tends to find their humor offensive. Oscar is reserved, although he is friendly when not outwardly pedantic. In an AfterElton.com interview, Núñez explained he plays the character of an accountant, who happens to be gay, and is not really interested in what the documentarians are filming. In the episode "Dwight Christmas", he is openly acknowledged as a Democrat. His more balanced and personality makes him an everyman-type character, contrasting with the generally extroverted people with whom he works.

Biography

Oscar works at Dunder Mifflin since 1999. He is openly gay (after being involuntarily outed by Michael) and previously lived with his partner, Gil. Even after his outing, Michael believed Gil to only be Oscar's roommate ("Gay Witch Hunt").

In earlier seasons, he is seen driving a Saturn Ion.  This is the same Saturn that Angela can later be seen driving, such as in the episode "Niagara".  However, he is seen in the third season driving a Lexus RX 400h, a company car he was lent as a result of his unwanted outing by Michael.

References

Fictional accountants
Fictional gay males
The Office (American TV series) characters
Television characters introduced in 2005
Atheism in television
Male characters in television
Fictional LGBT characters in television